Martin Mayman (1924–1999) was an American psychologist who worked with the Rorschach test. He received his B.S. degree in 1943 from the City College of New York, his M.S. in 1947 from New York University and his Ph.D. in 1953 from the University of Kansas.

He received the Bruno Klopfer Award in 1981.

References

External links 
Martin Mayman papers: 1945-1997 at the Bentley Historical Library.

1924 births
1999 deaths
20th-century American psychologists
City College of New York alumni
New York University alumni
University of Kansas alumni